Camaal Reid (born 17 May 1988) is a Jamaican footballer playing with Scarborough SC in the Canadian Soccer League.

Club career

Jamaica 
Reid began playing in the National Premier League in 2009 with Sporting Central Academy. He re-signed with Sporting for the 2010–11 season and helped the team avoid relegation. In 2011, he returned for his third season with Sporting and played in a friendly match against the Jamaica national team where Central Academy defeated the national team. He re-signed with Sporting for the 2014-15 season and marked his final season in the National Premier League as the club was relegated. He remained for Sporting the following season and played in the South Central Confederation Super League.

Canada 
In 2016, he played abroad in the Canadian Soccer League with the York Region Shooters. In his debut season with York Region, he assisted the club in producing an 11-game unbeaten streak. He would also assist the club in securing the First Division title and clinching a playoff berth. York Region would be eliminated in the second round of the playoffs to Hamilton City in a penalty shootout. 

He would re-sign with York Region for the 2017 season. Reid assisted the club in winning the CSL Championship after defeating Scarborough SC in a penalty shootout.  In 2018, he played in League1 Ontario with North Mississauga SC. He played with league rivals ProStars FC for the 2019 season.  

In 2021, he returned to the Canadian Soccer League to play with Scarborough SC. In his debut match for Scarborough, he recorded two goals against Toronto Tigers. He helped Scarborough qualify for the ProSound Cup tournament where he recorded a goal against Atletico Sporting Toronto which advanced the club to the finals. In the finals, Scarborough faced FC Vorkuta but was defeated in a penalty shootout. He also assisted the club in securing the CSL Championship where Scarborough defeated Vorkuta which marked his second championship title. 

Reid re-signed with Scarborough for the 2022 season. Throughout the 2022 campaign, the eastern Toronto side would achieve an 18-game undefeated streak and playoff position by finishing third. Reid made his third championship appearance, which Scarborough lost to FC Continentals (formerly FC Vorkuta).

International career 
Reid played in a friendly match against Jamaica national football team where he impressed the national team head coach Theodore Whitmore. After impressing the national team head coach he was called to the national team training camp in preparation for the 2014 FIFA World Cup qualification. He made his debut for the Jamaica national team on 24 February 2012 against Cuba in a friendly match.

Honors 
York Region Shooters
 CSL Championship: 2017
 Canadian Soccer League First Division: 2016  

Scarborough SC
 CSL Championship: 2021

References 

1988 births
Living people
Jamaica international footballers
Jamaican footballers
Sporting Central Academy players
York Region Shooters players
Scarborough SC players
National Premier League players
Canadian Soccer League (1998–present) players
Association football midfielders
North Mississauga SC players
ProStars FC players
People from Clarendon Parish, Jamaica